Arvon Township is a civil township of Baraga County in the U.S. state of Michigan.  As of the 2020 census, the township population was 492. Despite its name, Mount Arvon, the highest point in Michigan, is located just south of the township, in neighboring L'Anse Township.

Arvon Township's name is derived from that of the district of Carnarvon in Wales, famous for its slate industry, because of the deposits of slate in the township which were once the site of a failed quarry operation.

Communities 
There are no incorporated municipalities within the township. There are several unincorporated communities and historical locales:
 Arvon, named after the township in 1872, began as a slate quarry village. A post office operated from June 8, 1874, until November 18, 1879, and again from May 18, 1882, until October 14, 1893.
Aura is located at the base of the Point Abbaye peninsula on the northern side of Huron Bay.
Huron Bay is a community located on Huron Bay a few miles southwest of Skanee. Here there is a convenience store and a tavern. Huron Bay was formerly the terminus of the Iron Range and Huron Bay Railroad, built to carry iron ore from Champion to Huron Bay. A post office was in operation from July 29, 1892, until January 31, 1894.
McComb Corner is an unincorporated community in the township.
It is the site of the township hall, school, and post office. The Skanee ZIP code 49962 serves a large portion of Arvon Township. Skanee was founded by Captain Walfred Been, who came into Huron Bay and sought shelter from a storm in 1870. He named it after his home province of Skåne in Sweden.
St. Cyr is an unincorporated community in the township, lying on Huron Bay.

Geography

Arvon Township includes the Abbaye Peninsula, which projects into Lake Superior to form Huron Bay. The bay is long and narrow so its waters are significantly more protected than those of the open lake.  Much of the shoreline, particularly around the tip of the peninsula at Point Abbaye, is rocky, although there are some stretches of sandy beach.

Much of the land in Arvon Township is forest with mixed deciduous and coniferous trees. There are also jack pine barrens and eastern arborvitae swamps. In settled areas, there are many wild apple trees which now form a significant food source for deer. Arvon Township has a number of rivers, including the Huron River, which flow into Lake Superior. Because of these factors, the primary economic activities in Arvon Township are related to logging or tourism, particularly hunting and fishing.

Demographics
As of the census of 2000, there were 482 people, 222 households, and 150 families residing in the township.  The population density was 3.9 per square mile (1.5/km2).  There were 623 housing units at an average density of 5.0 per square mile (1.9/km2).  The racial makeup of the township was 93.36% White, 3.11% Native American, 0.41% Asian, and 3.11% from two or more races. 17.8% were of Swedish, 16.3% German, 14.8% Finnish, 7.8% French, 7.5% Irish and 6.6% Norwegian ancestry according to Census 2000.

There were 222 households, out of which 19.4% had children under the age of 18 living with them, 59.9% were married couples living together, 5.0% had a female householder with no husband present, and 32.0% were non-families. 29.3% of all households were made up of individuals, and 14.9% had someone living alone who was 65 years of age or older.  The average household size was 2.17 and the average family size was 2.67.

In the township the population was spread out, with 19.5% under the age of 18, 2.9% from 18 to 24, 16.8% from 25 to 44, 36.5% from 45 to 64, and 24.3% who were 65 years of age or older.  The median age was 51 years. For every 100 females, there were 106.9 males.  For every 100 females age 18 and over, there were 105.3 males.

The median income for a household in the township was $31,705, and the median income for a family was $39,545. Males had a median income of $26,786 versus $22,292 for females. The per capita income for the township was $19,800.  About 3.8% of families and 8.0% of the population were below the poverty line, including 18.9% of those under age 18 and 6.8% of those age 65 or over.

References

Townships in Baraga County, Michigan
Townships in Michigan
Michigan populated places on Lake Superior